Spreckels is an unincorporated community and census-designated place (CDP) in the Salinas Valley of Monterey County, California, United States. Its population was 692 at the 2020 census.

Spreckels is one of the best-preserved company towns in the United States. It was built to house workers for the Spreckels Sugar Company plant, which operated there from 1899 until 1982, named after its founder "Sugar King" Claus Spreckels.  When it opened, the Spreckels plant was the world's largest sugar beet factory, each day consuming  of water—with much of it pumped from wells—to process  of beets.

Spreckels is associated with the writer John Steinbeck, who lived and worked there for a time, and used it as a setting in his novel Tortilla Flat. Spreckels was used as a location for the 1955 Steinbeck movie East of Eden.

History
The Spreckels post office opened in 1898. The name honors Claus Spreckels, who built a sugar mill at the site.

Geography

Climate
This region experiences warm and dry summers, with no average monthly temperatures above .  According to the Köppen climate classification, Spreckels has a warm-summer Mediterranean climate, Csb on climate maps.

Employers
Spreckels is home to two major agricultural employers: Tanimura & Antle and D'Arrigo Brothers.

Demographics

2010

At the 2010 census, Spreckels had a population of 673. The racial makeup of Spreckels was 483 (71.8%) White, 0 (0.0%) African American, 13 (1.9%) Native American, 26 (3.9%) Asian, 130 (19.3%) from other races, and 21 (3.1%) from two or more races. Hispanics or Latinos of any race were 193 people (28.7%).

The whole population lived in households, no one lived in noninstitutionalized group quarters and no one was institutionalized.

Of the 229 households, 89 (38.9%) had children under 18 living in them, 134 (58.5%) were opposite-sex married couples living together, 27 (11.8%) had a female householder with no husband present, 12 (5.2%) had a male householder with no wife present, 7 (3.1%) were unmarried opposite-sex partnerships, and 2 (0.9%) were same-sex married couples or partnerships; 45 households (19.7%) were one person and 17 (7.4%) had someone living alone who was 65 or older. The average household size was 2.94.  There were 173 families (75.5% of households); the average family size was 3.38.

The age distribution was 172 people (25.6%) under 18, 44 people (6.5%) were 18 to 24, 173 people (25.7%) were 25 to 44, 208 people (30.9%) were 45 to 64, and 76 people (11.3%) were 65 or older.  The median age was 39.4 years. For every 100 females, there were 93.9 males.  For every 100 females 18 and over, there were 92.7 males.

The 246 housing units had an average density of 2,013.8 per square mile; of the occupied units, 160 (69.9%) were owner-occupied and 69 (30.1%) were rented. The homeowner vacancy rate was 3.6%; the rental vacancy rate was 2.8%.  In all, 467 people (69.4% of the population) lived in owner-occupied housing units and 206 people (30.6%) lived in rental housing units.

2000
At the 2000 census, 485 people, 171 households, and 127 families were in the CDP. The racial makeup of the CDP was 86.39% White, 0.62% African American, 1.65% Native American, 2.68% Asian, 6.80% from other races, and 1.86% from two or more races. Hispanics or Latinos of any race were 27.63%.

Of the 171 households, 40.9% had children under 18 living with them, 56.7% were married couples living together, 13.5% had a female householder with no husband present, and 25.7% were not families. About 17.0% of households were one person and 6.4% were one person 65 or older. The average household size was 2.84, and the average family size was 3.20.

The age distribution was 29.1% under 18, 5.4% from 18 to 24, 29.3% from 25 to 44, 25.4% from 45 to 64, and 10.9% 65 or older. The median age was 38 years. For every 100 females, there were 94.0 males. For every 100 females age 18 and over, there were 93.3 males.

The median household income was $58,009 and the median family income was $51,250. Males had a median income of $22,250 versus $24,750 for females. The per capita income for the CDP was $19,752. None of the families and 1.1% of the population were living below the poverty line, including none under 18 and none over 64.

References

External links
 Spreckels Guide—Monterey County Convention & Visitors Bureau

Company towns in California
Census-designated places in Monterey County, California
Salinas Valley
Unincorporated communities in Monterey County, California
Populated places established in 1899
1899 establishments in California
Unincorporated communities in California